Modified d'Hondt electoral system
is a variant of single transferable voting, where an electoral threshold for parties is applied. The difference to single transferable voting is, that any votes for parties below the electoral threshold are transferred to other parties according to the ranking on the ballot across party lines. The parties below electoral threshold are determined by first preference counts. The use of the electoral threshold could reduce the fragmentation of the parliament. This electoral system is a type of open list party-list proportional representation, where the preference of candidates within a party-list is indicated by ranking. 

This electoral system was first used in 1989 Australian Capital Territory general election, with an electoral threshold of 5%. Here ranking only parties without ranking candidates was possible by voting above the line. A similar preferential party system is the spare vote electoral system, which ranks political parties.

Disadvantages
If the electoral threshold is set below the natural threshold, then the results of Modified d'Hondt electoral system is indistinguishable from the more common single transferable voting. This was the case in the Australian Capital Territory general election, where the natural threshold was higher than the explicit electoral threshold of 5%. Higher district magnitudes with lower natural thresholds increase the ballot size and makes ballot counting more difficult.

See also
 Ranked voting
 Single transferable vote
 Spare vote

References

Electoral systems
Preferential electoral systems
Proportional representation electoral systems